Olive Rita Webb (25 February 1904 – 30 August 1981), later known as Olive Rita Thompson, was an English character actress, mainly in comedy roles. She was the eldest child of Henry Augustus Webb (1880–1926) and Rose Jeannette Keysor. She had a younger brother, Henry Richard Webb, also an actor, and two elder identical twin half-brothers, Leslie and Gordon Durlacher, from her mother's first marriage to Samuel Durlacher. She was the niece of Leonard Keysor, the first Jewish serviceman to win the Victoria Cross in the First World War. A half-brother was the actor George Webb.

Career 
Born in Willesden, Middlesex, United Kingdom, she is best known for her appearances as a stooge for Benny Hill in his long-running Thames Television series. At under five feet tall, with a booming voice and dyed flame-red hair, she was often cast as a blowsey mother-in-law or Cockney type character.

In 1958, she, Roger Livesey, Terry-Thomas, Judith Furse, Avril Angers, and Miles Malleson, recorded "Indian Summer of an Uncle" and "Jeeves Takes Charge" for the Caedmon Audio record label (Caedmon Audio TC-1137). It was released in stereo in 1964.

In the 1960s, she made a number of television appearances with Billy Cotton and alongside Arthur Haynes. Her many other television credits include several appearances in Spike Milligan's Q series, Dixon of Dock Green, Till Death Us Do Part, Sykes, Up Pompeii! with Frankie Howerd, The Wednesday Play and Steptoe and Son. In the Space: 1999 episode "The Taybor" she appeared as a deliberately-unattractive form assumed by the shapeshifter Maya.

She also appeared in supporting roles in many films, including To Sir, with Love (1967), The Magic Christian (1969), Alfred Hitchcock's Frenzy (1972), Confessions of a Pop Performer (1975), and Come Play with Me (1977).

Personal life and death
Following her separation from her husband, she lived with Al Jeffery "Jeffie", an accomplished banjo player, whom she adored. She was called "Podge" by Jeffie and was proud that she still had all her own teeth. She signed her letters "Dame Rita Webb" and refused to appear on the TV show This is Your Life. She and her brother were exceptionally close and they talked every night on the telephone until her death.
Webb died in 1981, aged 77, from cancer. Her funeral was held at West London Crematorium and a memorial service took place at St. Paul's Church, Covent Garden.

Selected filmography

References

External links

Rita Webb at the British Film Institute
Rita's Bleedin' Website - Fan Site
Rita Webb (Aveleyman)

English television actresses
English film actresses
People from Willesden
1904 births
1981 deaths
Burials at Kensal Green Cemetery
20th-century English actresses